Hale crater may refer to:

 Hale (lunar crater), a crater on the moon
 Hale (Martian crater), a crater on mars